Richard MacDonnell may refer to:
 Richard Graves MacDonnell (1814–1881), Anglo-Irish lawyer, judge and colonial governor
 Richard MacDonnell (scholar) (1787–1867), 29th Provost of Trinity College, Dublin
 Richard MacDonnell (Newfoundland politician) (1841–1928), Irish-born businessman and politician in Newfoundland